Tokyo High School (東京高等学校 Tōkyō Kōtōgakkō) is an independent high school in Ōta, Tokyo, Japan. It was founded in 1872 in what is now Ueno district of Taitō under the name Ueno-juku. It moved to its present location in Ōmori, Ōta in 1934, and assumed its present name in 1954 (a former "Tokyo High School" having become part of Tokyo University). It became co-educational in 1971.

Notable alumni

Writers
You Sano, mystery novelist
Yūzō Yamamoto, playwright

Entertainers
Hiroya Ishimaru, voice actor
Makidai, dancer
Shinji Maki, ukelele player
Yuka Nomura, actress
Tatekawa Danshi, Rakugoka

Athletes
Taku Bamba, race car driver
Asuka Cambridge, sprinter
Kyosuke Horie, rugby player
Yuya Iwadate, footballer
Chinatsu Mori, shot putter
Yuya Saito, rugby player
Tomokazu Soma, rugby player

Others
Shigetarō Shimada, Imperial Japanese Navy admiral and war criminal

See also

References

External links
School website (in Japanese)

High schools in Tokyo
Educational institutions established in 1872
1872 establishments in Japan